Camilla Kruger (born 19 September 1986) is a Zimbabwean Olympic eventing rider. She competed at the 2016 Summer Olympics in Rio de Janeiro where she placed 35th in the individual competition.

Kruger became the first Zimbabwean equestrian rider to compete at the Olympics.

CCI 4* Results

References

External links
 
 

Living people
1986 births
Zimbabwean female equestrians
Equestrians at the 2016 Summer Olympics
Olympic equestrians of Zimbabwe
White Zimbabwean sportspeople